The Minister for the National Disability Insurance Scheme is an Australian Government cabinet position which is currently held by Bill Shorten following the swearing in of the full Albanese ministry on 1 June 2022.

In the Government of Australia, the minister administers this portfolio through the Department of Social Services. The portfolio is responsible for the management of the National Disability Insurance Scheme.

List of Ministers for the National Disability Insurance Scheme
The following individuals have been appointed as Ministers for the National Disability Insurance Scheme, or any of its precedent titles:

List of assistant ministers
The following individuals have been appointed as Assistant Minister for Social Services and Disability Services, or any of its precedent titles:

References

External links
 

National Disability Insurance Scheme